The Franklin Mountain talus snail, scientific name Sonorella metcalfi, is a species of air-breathing land snail, a terrestrial pulmonate gastropod mollusk in the subfamily Helminthoglyptinae. This species is endemic to the United States.

The name "talus snail" refers to the fact that snails in this genus live on and in talus. This species is called "Franklin Mountain talus snail" after the Franklin Mountains in Texas.

The specific name metcalfi honors the American Malacologist Artie L. Metcalf

References

Molluscs of the United States
Sonorella
Gastropods described in 1976
Taxonomy articles created by Polbot